Philorth Halt railway station was a railway station near Philorth House, south of Fraserburgh in Aberdeenshire.

History 
The station was opened on 24 April 1865 by the Formartine and Buchan Railway. It was originally private and built for the residents of Philorth House. This house burned down in 1915. The station opened to the public on 26 July 1926. To the north was a siding. Passenger trains through Philorth were withdrawn on 4 October 1965 and the track lifted following the withdrawal of freight trains in 1979.

References

 

Disused railway stations in Aberdeenshire
Beeching closures in Scotland
Former Great North of Scotland Railway stations
Railway stations in Great Britain opened in 1865
Railway stations in Great Britain closed in 1965
1865 establishments in Scotland
1965 disestablishments in Scotland